Queenie Leonard (born Pearl Walker; 18 February 1905 – 17 January 2002) was a British actress. She was the last surviving cast member of And Then There Were None (1945) until her death in 2002.

Biography
She was born as Pearl Walker in Manchester, Lancashire, England in 1905 and began performing on stage with her father when she was 14 years old. She debuted on film in 1931. She had already amassed 20 years of stage and screen experience when, in 1941, she made the first of more than 30 Hollywood films. She also appeared in cabaret in Britain and in the United States, starred in a one-woman show, acted in television sitcoms, and provided voices for Disney animated films. She retired in 1968. Her last appearance was in 20th Century Fox's Star!.

Leonard was married to film designer Lawrence P. Williams from 1936 to 1947, and to actor Tom Conway from 1958 to 1963. Both unions were childless and ended in divorce.

Leonard was legally blind for part of her life.

On 17 January 2002, Leonard died of natural causes at her apartment in West Los Angeles, one month before her 97th birthday. She is buried in the Westwood Village Memorial Park Cemetery in Los Angeles in the burial plot called the "Garden of Roses". She was the last surviving cast member of And Then There Were None (1945).

Complete filmography

References

External links

 
 
 
 

1905 births
2002 deaths
Actresses from London
British expatriate actresses in the United States
Burials at Westwood Village Memorial Park Cemetery
English film actresses
English stage actresses
English television actresses
English voice actresses
20th-century English actresses